A Composition with Creditors is an agreement among several creditors of a debtor, usually a business.  Usually, the agreement involves paying a lessened amount over a period of time.

See also
Company Voluntary Arrangement
Individual Voluntary Arrangement

Credit
Debt collection